Proceq SA of Switzerland is a technology company in the nondestructive testing space. The company name Proceq is taken from a combination of the words “processes” and “equipment”. The main focus is on imaging solutions for non destructive testing of concrete structures, metal hardness testing, paper roll hardness testing and rock testing. Proceq is well known for patenting the Original Schmidt concrete test hammer as well as the Leeb rebound principle and is also the owner of the “Pundit” trademark for ultrasonic test equipment. The company is still privately owned by the founder's family Brandestini/Valsangiacomo.

History
Proceq SA was founded on 8 April 1954 by Antonio Brandestini, when it opened its first office in Zurich, Switzerland. During its early years, the company concentrated on developing and selling special equipment for pre-stressed concrete engineering, a field which was, at that time, in its infancy. It also developed bearings for the construction industry. The introduction of the Original Schmidt concrete test hammer was a significant event in the company's history and in the years that followed the company evolved to focus entirely on portable Nondestructive testing test instrument. 
All manufacturing is based in Switzerland, but Proceq has subsidiaries in Europe, Asia, the Middle East, the US and South America.

Research and development 
Proceq has its own research and development team, based at the headquarters in Switzerland. Two major patents have been produced by this team. The first was the Original Schmidt test hammer, the second was the Leeb rebound principle (named after the Proceq scientist Dietmar Leeb). This principle is employed in the Equotip metal hardness tester.
Both of these Proceq innovations have been recognized by international standard bodies such as ASTM, ISO and the EN standards authority.
In recent years, Proceq has expanded into the fields of imaging with ultrasonics and GPR of concrete structures.

References

External links
 Official Website
 ASTM Standards Institution

Engineering companies of Switzerland
Nondestructive testing